Mike Bennett is an English former professional rugby league footballer who played as a  forward for St Helens in the Super League.

Bennett played for St Helens as a  forward, scoring a try in their 2002 Super League Grand Final victory against the Bradford Bulls. St Helens reached the 2006 Super League Grand final to be contested against Hull FC, and Bennett played from the interchange bench in Saints' 26–4 victory. In 2005, Bennett represented England, coming off the bench in a 22–12 victory against France. As 2006 Super League champions, St. Helens faced 2006 NRL Premiers the Brisbane Broncos in the 2007 World Club Challenge.

Bennett announced on 1 September 2008 that he would retire at the end of 2008 season due to injury.

References

External links

Mike Bennett Player Profile
Bennett signs new Saints contract
Profile at saints.org.uk

1980 births
Living people
England national rugby league team players
English rugby league players
Rugby league second-rows
Rugby league players from Warrington
St Helens R.F.C. players